Jonas Acquistapace (born 18 June 1989) is a German professional footballer who plays as a centre-back.

Club career
Acquistapace played for Omonia Nicosia on Cyprus six months. He returned to Germany in January 2015 signing for 3. Liga side SV Wehen Wiesbaden on a year and a half-deal until 2016. He made his competitive debut for the club on 3 February 2015 in a 0–0 away draw with Borussia Dortmund II.

Career statistics

References

External links
 
 

1989 births
Living people
German footballers
German people of Italian descent
Association football defenders
VfL Bochum players
VfL Bochum II players
AC Omonia players
SV Wehen Wiesbaden players
Hallescher FC players
FSV Zwickau players
Sportfreunde Lotte players
SC Verl players
SG Wattenscheid 09 players
SV Lippstadt 08 players
2. Bundesliga players
3. Liga players
Regionalliga players
Cypriot First Division players
People from Soest, Germany
Sportspeople from Arnsberg (region)
Footballers from North Rhine-Westphalia
German expatriate footballers
German expatriate sportspeople in Cyprus
Expatriate footballers in Cyprus